KISS: Rock the Nation Live! is a 2005 live music DVD by American hard rock band Kiss. The DVD is notable for the addition of "Kiss Powervision", which enables the viewer to select different camera angles, each focusing on a different member of the band. The DVD is a compilation of footage from two concerts, performed in Washington, DC, and Virginia Beach, VA, on July 24 and 25, 2004.

Reception
Rock the Nation Live! was certified double platinum in the US.

Track listing

Charts

Certifications

References

External links
 Kiss Online

Kiss (band) video albums
2004 video albums
Live video albums
2004 live albums